Amanita franchetii, also known as the Franchet's amanita, is a species of fungus in the family Amanitaceae. It was given its current name by Swiss mycologist Victor Fayod in 1889 in honor of French botanist Adrien René Franchet.  A. franchetii occurs in Europe and North Africa with oaks (Quercus ssp.), chestnuts (Castanea ssp.), and pines (Pinus ssp.).

A similar fungus in western North America was also referred to as A. franchetii, but was long suspected of being a separate, undescribed species, and in 2013 was formally described under the name Amanita augusta.

Amanita aspera and Amanita franchetii are synonyms.

There also exists a variety known as Amanita franchetii var. lactella that is entirely white except for the bright yellow universal veil remnants. It is found in the western Mediterranean region, associated with several species of oak (Quercus suber and Q. robur) and hornbeam (Carpinus betulus), and is also reported from Serbia.

Description
The cap is 5–12 cm wide, and is yellow-brown to brown in color. The flesh is white or pale yellow, and has a mild odor. The closely spaced gills are the same color as the flesh. The stipe is thick and larger at the base, also white to yellowish; loose areas of yellow veil form on the base. A thick ring is left by the partial veil.

Edibility
Amanita franchetii is considered inedible, and is reported as being toxic when raw or undercooked. Although the species was implicated in the 2005 deaths of ten people in China who displayed symptoms similar to those caused by amatoxin poisoning, this case report has been called into question for possible misidentification of the mushrooms involved.

See also

List of Amanita species

References

External links

  - A description of the western North American species.
 Amanita franchetii var. lactella photo, from Aranzadi Society of Sciences, Mycology Gallery.

franchetii
Fungi of North America
Fungi described in 1889
Inedible fungi